Baynard House is a brutalist office block in Queen Victoria Street in Blackfriars in the City of London, occupied by BT Group. It was built on the site of Baynard's Castle. Most of the land under it is a scheduled monument. From 1982 to 1997 it housed the BT Museum.

Features and uses
The building was designed by William Holford incorporating a separation of pedestrians from streets, with a first-floor adjoining walkway along Queen Victoria Street that connects to Blackfriars station. The entrance foyer to Baynard House remains off this first floor level. A plaque in the building foyer reads:

Legislation protecting the sightline of St Paul's Cathedral from bridges across the Thames and from places such as Putney and Richmond Park restricted the overall height of the building to three full levels above ground.

Baynard House was for a few years a telephone exchange, and housed the first operational System X telephone exchange, which went live in 1980.  From 1982 to 1997 it housed the BT Museum.

It is the site of an unusual cast aluminium public sculpture by Richard Kindersley, entitled The Seven Ages of Man. The sculpture, consisting of a column made up of sculptural heads resembling a totem pole, was commissioned by Post Office Telecommunications and unveiled in April 1980.

 it had the largest solar panel area in the City of London and the second largest of a corporate building in the UK.

The Faraday Building, one of the first major telephone exchanges in the UK, is across the road.

In film
Actor Tom Cruise broke his ankle whilst performing a stunt, jumping from the roof in 2017, shooting scenes for the film Mission: Impossible – Fallout.

References

External links 

 Baynard House – Brutalist Beauty
 The Seven Ages of Man

Gallery 

Buildings and structures in the City of London
British Telecom buildings and structures
Telephone exchange buildings
Telecommunications buildings in the United Kingdom
Scheduled monuments in London
Brutalist architecture in London
Blackfriars, London